The Andropogoneae, sometimes called the sorghum tribe, are a large tribe of grasses (family Poaceae) with roughly 1,200 species in 90 genera, mainly distributed in tropical and subtropical areas. They include such important crops as maize (corn), sugarcane, and sorghum.  All species in this tribe use C4 carbon fixation, which makes them competitive under warm, high-light conditions.

Andropogoneae is classified in supertribe Andropogonodae together with its sister group Arundinelleae. Subdivisions include 12 subtribes, but the position of several genera within them is still unresolved (incertae sedis). Hybridisation was probably important in the evolution of the Andropogoneae, and the tribe's systematics is still not completely resolved.

Description
Spikelets within the inflorescence (flower cluster) are generally arranged on spicate racemes in pairs. A fertile, unstalked spikelet is subtended by a sterile, stalked spikelet.  In species where awns are present they are found on the fertile, unstalked spikelet as an extension of the lemma.

Subtribes and genera
Classification following Soreng et al. (2017).

References

 
Panicoideae
Poaceae tribes